Otto Lessing may refer to:

Otto Lessing (sculptor) (1846–1912), German sculptor and designer
Otto Lessing (general) (1904–?), US Marine major general